Year 1433 (MCDXXXIII) was a common year starting on Thursday (link will display the full calendar) of the Julian calendar.

Events 
 January–December 
 May 31 – Sigismund is crowned Holy Roman Emperor in Rome. There has been no crowned Emperor since the death of his father, Charles IV, in 1378.
 August 14 – Edward I becomes King of Portugal.
 September – Cosimo de' Medici, later the de facto ruler of Florence and patron of Marsilio Ficino, is exiled by the Albizzi/Strozzi faction (Cosimo returns a year later, in September 1434).
 October – Iliaș of Moldavia is deposed by his half-brother and joint ruler Stephen II.

 Date unknown 
 The Ming Dynasty in China completes its last great maritime expedition, led by Admiral Zheng He; the fleet would be dispersed, altering the balance of power in the Indian Ocean, and making it easier for Portugal and other Western naval powers to gain dominance over the seas.
 In Ming Dynasty China, cotton is listed as a permanent item of trade, on the tax registers of Songjiang prefecture.
 Kalantiaw (of what would later be known as the Philippines) supposedly promulgates the legal code eventually referred to as the Code of Kalantiaw. Modern historians doubt its existence.

Births 
 August 31 – Sigismondo d'Este, Italian nobleman (d. 1507)
 September 17 – James of Portugal, Portuguese cardinal (d. 1459)
 September 24 – Shekha of Amarsar, Rajput chieftain (d. 1488)
 September 27 – Stanisław Kazimierczyk, Polish canon regular and saint (d. 1489)
 October 19 – Marsilio Ficino, Florentine philosopher (d. 1499)
 November 10
 Charles the Bold, Duke of Burgundy (d. 1477)
 Jeanne de Laval, French noble, queen consort of Naples (d. 1498)
 date unknown 
Stephen III of Moldavia, prince from 1457 (d. 1504)
Giovanni Giocondo, Veronese-born friar, architect and classical scholar (d. 1515)
 probable – Kettil Karlsson, regent of Sweden from 1464 (d. 1465)

Deaths 
 April 14 – Lidwina, Dutch saint (b. 1380)
 August 14 – King John I of Portugal (b. 1357)
 August 30 – Peter I, Count of Saint-Pol (b. 1390) 
 September – Zweder van Culemborg, Bishop of Utrecht (birth year unknown)
 September 28 – Přemek I, Duke of Opava (b. c.1365)
 December 1 – Emperor Go-Komatsu, the 100th emperor of Japan (b. 1377)

References